The 2008–09 East Midlands Counties Football League season was the first in the history of East Midlands Counties Football League, a football competition in England.

League

The league was formed by the clubs joined from three local leagues.

Clubs, transferred from the Northern Counties East League:
Borrowash Victoria
Gedling Town

Clubs, joined from the Central Midlands Football League:
Blackwell Miners Welfare
Dunkirk
Gedling Miners Welfare
Graham Street Prims
Greenwood Meadows
Heanor Town
Holbrook Miners Welfare
Radford

Clubs, joined from the Leicestershire Senior League:
Bardon Hill Sports
Barrow Town
Ellistown
Hinckley Downes
Holwell Sports
Ibstock United
Kirby Muxloe
St Andrews

League table

References

External links
 East Midlands Counties Football League official site

2008–09
10